Pecka is a market town in Jičín District in the Hradec Králové Region of the Czech Republic. It has about 1,300 inhabitants. The historic town centre with the castle ruin is well preserved and is protected by law as an urban monument zone.

Administrative parts
Villages of Arnoštov, Bělá u Pecky, Bukovina u Pecky, Horní Javoří, Kal, Staňkov and Vidonice are administrative parts of Pecka.

Geography
It lies in the Giant Mountains Foothills. The Javorka River flows next to the market town.

History

The Pecka Castle was founded in the early 13th century. The first written mention of Pecka is from 1322, when a settlement started to grow below the castle. In 1382, it was promoted to a town. In the late 16th century, the Gothic castle was rebuilt to a Renaissance residence. The most famous owner of the castle was Kryštof Harant until his death in 1621. In 1830, the castle was burned down and turn into a ruin.

Sights
The Pecka Castle is open to the public and contains several expositions.

The Church of Saint Bartholomew was built by Carthusians in 1751–1753, when it replaced an old stone church from 1603.

References

External links

Pecka Castle

Market towns in the Czech Republic
Populated places in Jičín District